Pleasant Plain may refer to a place in the United States:

 Pleasant Plain, Indiana
 Pleasant Plain, Iowa
 Pleasant Plain, Ohio